Telepathic with the Deceased is the third album by American black metal artist Xasthur. It was released on August 17, 2004, on Moribund Records.

Track listing

Personnel
Malefic – vocals, all instruments

Production
Xasthur – arrangement, production, recording, engineering, mixing
Kevin Nettleingham – mastering

References

2004 albums
Xasthur albums